Rhoda Dakar (born 1959) is a British singer and musician, best known as the lead singer of The Bodysnatchers, who were signed to the 2 Tone record label. She also worked with The Specials and Special AKA, also 2-Tone artists.

Career
Dakar, born in Hampstead, London, joined The Bodysnatchers in 1979. Their first single was a double A-side "Let's Do Rock Steady" backed with "Ruder Than You". It reached # 22 in the UK Singles Chart. The band were invited to appear on Top of the Pops, to tour with The Selecter and to record a session for BBC Radio 1 disc jockey John Peel. Their second single "Easy Life" coupled with their version of Bob Andy's "Too Experienced" reached number 50. Several members of the Bodysnatchers then left to form The Belle Stars.

Dakar also collaborated with The Specials. Her duet with Terry Hall, "I Can't Stand It", appeared on the album More Specials. After The Specials announced their break up in 1981, Jerry Dammers formed  The Special AKA, along with Dakar and John Bradbury. Their first single release, "The Boiler", reached # 35 in the UK Singles Chart in 1982.

Dakar performed on The Special AKA album In the Studio, which featured the UK Top 10 single "Free Nelson Mandela". The album reached # 34 in the UK Albums Chart.

Her first solo album, Cleaning in Another Woman's Kitchen, was released in November 2007 on Moon Ska World. It featured acoustic versions of songs from the Bodysnatchers as well as material co-written with Nick Welsh, who attended the same comprehensive school as Buster Bloodvessel, and who recorded as King Hammond in the early 1990s. Dakar and Welsh released a garage rock album Back to the Garage on N1 Records in April 2009.

In 2009, she was the featured guest vocalist on the song "On the Town" on the Madness album The Liberty of Norton Folgate. She performed the track at their Madstock show in Victoria Park, London in July 2009.

In 2015, she returned to the studio to re-record The Bodysnatchers tracks for the album Rhoda Dakar Sings the Bodysnatchers. The line up for the recording included Lynval Golding and Horace Panter from The Specials, plus members of Pama International and Intensified.

In 2022, Rhoda had a guest appearance on the song "As We Live" on the album "In the Wild" by The Interrupters.

Discography

Singles

The Bodysnatchers
 "Let's Do Rock Steady"  UK #22  (March 1980)
 "Easy Life"  UK #50  (July 1980)

The Special AKA
 "The Boiler"  UK #35  (January 1982)
 "Racist Friend"  UK #60  (September 1983)
 "Free Nelson Mandela"  UK #9  (March 1984)
 "What I Like Most About You Is Your Girlfriend"  UK #51  (September 1984)

Rhoda Dakar
 "Everyday Is Like Sunday" (April 2021)
 "The Man Who Sold The World" (January 2022)
 "Walking After Midnight" (March 2022)
 "As Tears Go By" (July 2022) 
 "What a Wonderful World" (January 2023)

Albums
 Various Artists, Dance Craze #5 (February 1981)
 Various Artists, This Are Two Tone UK #51 (November 1983)
 Various Artists, The Two Tone Story UK #16 (July 1989)
 The Special AKA, In the Studio UK #34 (June 1984)
 Rhoda Dakar, Cleaning in Another Woman's Kitchen (November 2007)
 Rhoda Dakar & Nick Welsh, Back to the Garage (April 2009)
 Rhoda Dakar, Rhoda Dakar Sings the Bodysnatchers (August 2015)
 Rhoda Dakar, The Lotek Four Vol. I (October 2016)
 Rhoda Dakar, The Lotek Four Vol. II (October 2018)

References

British ska musicians
English rock singers
English women singers
Women new wave singers
People from Hampstead
1959 births
Living people
2 Tone Records artists
The Specials members